3XN is a Danish architectural practice with head office in Copenhagen.

History
The company was founded in Århus in 1986 as Nielsen, Nielsen & Nielsen (later 3 X Nielsen) by Kim Herforth Nielsen, Lars Frank Nielsen and Hans Peter Svendler Nielsen. The latter left the company, which is today led by a partner group of three with Kim Herforth Nielsen as the Principal Architect. The practice had its international breakthrough in the late 90s with the Danish Embassy in Berlin (completed in 1999) and the Muziekgebouw Concert Hall in Amsterdam (competition win in 1997). In 2005 3XN won the competition for the new Museum of Liverpool which opened in 2011.

Among 3XNs high profiled Danish projects are Ørestad Gymnasium (High school) (2007), the renovation of Tivoli’s Concert Hall (2005), Alsion, university, concert hall and research centre in Sønderborg (2007), the headquarters of Saxo Bank in Copenhagen (2008), the headquarters of the law firm Horten (2009), Middelfart Savings Bank (2010) and KPMG Headquarters (2011). Under construction are Bella Sky – the biggest hotel in Scandinavia, Lighthouse, a highrise in Århus, a new town hall in the Dutch city Nieuwegein and Denmark’s new Aquarium, The Blue Planet in Copenhagen.
Recently 3XN has won the competition to design the new headquarters for Swedbank in Stockholm and another Swedish residential project in Vällingby. 3XN is also present in Norway with projects such as the Theatre and Jazz House in Molde and a Culture House in Mandal.

In 2007 3XN established the research and development department GXN working on implementing new (green) materials and technologies in the studio’s projects. The R&D department also develops new projects and designs of lamps for instance. GXN is also behind the green Louisiana Pavilion displayed at the Danish art museum Louisiana during COP15. The pavilion is built with a biocomposite especially developed for the purpose. GXN works with Cradle to Cradle Denmark at developing the first Danish building manual based on the Cradle to Cradle principles.

In 2010 3XN created the exhibition Mind Your Behaviour, which was shown at Danish Architecture Centre and at Aedes Gallery in Berlin.

Selected projects

Completed

Architect’s House, Copenhagen, Denmark(1996)
 Buen kulturhus, Mandal, Norway (2012)
 Danish Embassy, Berlin (1999)
 Tivoli Concert Hall extension, Copenhagen (2005)
 Muziekgebouw Concert Hall, Amsterdam (2005)
 Sampension Headquarters, Copenhagen (2005)
 Ørestad College, Ørestad, Copenhagen (2007)
 Saxo Bank building, Copenhagen (2008)
 Horsens Stadium, Horsens, Denmark (2010)
 Middelfart Savings Bank, Middelfart, Denmark (2010)
 Hotel Bella Sky, Ørestad, Copenhagen (2011)
 Museum of Liverpool, Liverpool (2011)
 Railyards Cultural Centre, Aarhus, Denmark (2012)
 Gemeentehuis Nieuwegein, Nieuwegein, Netherlands (2012)
 Frederiksberg Courthouse, Copenhagen, Denmark (2012)
 Lighthouse phase 1, Aarhus, Denmark (2012)
 Blue Planet, Copenhagen, Denmark (2013)
 Plassen Cultural Center, Molde, Norway (2012)
 UN Building, Copenhagen, Denmark (2013)
 Swedbank Headquarters, Stockholm, Sweden (2014)
 Odenplan Station, Stockholm, Sweden (2015)
 Rigshospitalet Patient Hotel, Copenhagen, Denmark (2015)
 Royal Arena, Copenhagen, Denmark (2017)
 Segerstedthuset at Uppsala University, Uppsala, Sweden (2017)
 IOC Headquarters, Lausanne, Switzerland (2019)
 Renngasse 10, Vienna, Austria (2019)
 Rigshospitalet North Wing, Copenhagen, Denmark 2020)
 Mälardalen University, Eskilstuna, Sweden (2020)
 Astoriahuset and Nybrogatan 17, Stockholm, Sweden (2020)
 Klimatorium, Lemvig, Denmark (2020)
 cube berlin, Berlin, Germany (2020)
 Espace Confluence, Namur, Belgium (2021)
 Aquabella, Toronto, Canada (2022)
 Green Solution House 2.0, Bornholm, Denmark (2022)
 Vinci InDéfense and Hotel OKKO, Paris La Défense, Nanterre, France (2022)
 Quay Quarter Tower, Sydney, Australia (2022)

In progress
 Lighthouse (phase 2), Århus, Denmark (expected completion 2023)
 Aquatic Center, Linköping, Sweden (competition win, February 2017, expected completion 2023)
 Sydney Fish Market, Sydney, Australia (competition win June 2017)
 Copenhagen Children's Hospital, Copenhagen, Denmark (competition win July 2017)
 Aqualuna, Toronto, Canada (competition win 2017)
 Schüco Headquarters extension, Bielefeld, Germany (competition win 2017)
 SAP Garden, Munich, Germany (competition win 2018, expected completion 2024)
 T3 Bayside, Toronto, Canada (competition win 2018, expected completion 2023)
 2 Finsbury Avenue at Broadgate, London, UK (competition win 2019)
 Forskaren, Hagastaden, Sweden (competition win 2019) 
 Palais des Congrès, Nîmes, France (competition win 2019)
 Cobot Hub, Odense, Denmark (competition win 2020)
 Tilia Tower, Lausanne, Switzerland (competition win 2020)
 Shenzhen Natural History Museum, Shenzhen, China (competition win 2020)
 BMW Master Plan (with OMA), Munich, Germany (competition win 2022)
 EPFL Ecotope (competition win 2022)
 Stockholm University of the Arts (competition win, 2022)

Awards
 1988 Nykredit Architecture Prize
 2005 RIBA European Award for Sampension
 2005 MIPIM AR Future Projects Award for City for All Age in Valby, Copenhagen
 2005 International Olympic Committee IOC/IAKS Award for DGI Urban Sports Centre in Århus
 Best New Building in the Netherlands 2006 for Muziekgebouw
 2006 ULI Europe Award for Muziekgebouw
 2006 Dedalo Minosse Award for Muziekgebouw
 2006 MIPIM AR Future Projects Award (residential category) for Nordhavnen Residences and (office category) for Middelfart Savings Bank
 2006 LEAF Award for Muziekgebouw
 2007 RIBA European Award for Alsion
 2008 Forum AiD Award for Ørestad College
 2009 RIBA International Award for Saxo Bank
 2011 RIBA European Award for Middelfart Savings Bank
 2012 WAF Award for Rigshospital extension
 2013 RIBA EU Award for Frederiksberg Courthouse
  2014 RIBA European Award for Den Blå Planet
  2014 GreenBuilding Awards, European Commission for Swedbank Headquarters
 2015 ULI Global Excellence Award for Swedbank Headquarters
 2015 Architizer A+ Award (Museum category, Popular Choice Winner) for Den Blå Planet
 2017 Architizer A+ Award (Stadium category, Jury Winner) for Royal Arena
 2018 WAF Award (Best Office – Future Projects) for Olympic House, IOC Headquarters
 2019 MIPIM Future Project Award (Best Residential) for Aqualuna
 2019 Architizer A+ Award (Best Commercial: Unbuilt, Jury Winner) for Sydney Fish Market
 2019 Blueprint Award (Overall Winner: Future Projects) for Aqualuna and (Best Retail: Future Projects) for Sydney Fish Market
 2020 MIPIM Future Projects Award (Sports & Stadiums category) for SAP Garden
 2020 Architizer A+ Award (Architecture: Sustainability category Jury and Popular Choice Winner) for Olympic House, IOC Headquarters
 2020 German Design Award (Gold Award in Architecture category) for cube berlin
 2020 Årets Byggeri for Klimatorium
 2020 WAN Award (Gold Award in Sustainable Buildings category) for Olympic House, IOC Headquarters
 2021 European Healthcare Design Award (Best Healthcare Design over 25,000 sqm) for The North Wing, Rigshospitalet
 2021 WAN Awards (Gold in Civic - Community and Tourist Hubs and Event Spaces category) for Klimatorium
 2022 Swedish Architects Södermanland Architecture Prize (Renovation and Interior Architecture category) for Mälardalen University
 2022 MIPIM Award (Best Refurbished Building) for Astoriahuset & Nybrogatan 17
 2022 Engineers Australia Excellence Award (Sydney Winner) for Quay Quarter Tower
 2022 WAN Award (Gold in Tall Buildings category) for Quay Quarter Tower
 2022 International Highrise Award for Quay Quarter Tower

Exhibitions
 2010 Denmark Updated, Essen, DE 						
 2010 12. Biennale Architettura, The Danish Pavilion, Venice, IT
 2010 Mind Your Behaviour, Aedes, Berlin, DE (solo)
 2010 Mind Your Behaviour, DAC, Copenhagen, DK (solo)	
 2009-2010 It’s a Small World, Copenhagen, DK (tour: Shanghai EXPO 2010, CN, Curitiba, BR, Santiago, CL)
 2009 ShowHow, Copenhagen, DK (tour: London, UK)
 2009 Green Architecture for the Future, Louisiana, Humlebæk, DK
 2008 11. Biennale Architettura, The Danish Pavilion, Venice, IT
 2008 Architecture is a conversation that never ends, Paris, FR (solo)	
 2008-10 Building Sustainable Communities, DAC, Copenhagen, DK (tour: UAE, SE, DE, PL, CN, RU, LV)
 2008 Sust-DANE-able, London, UK
 2007 Architecture and Design Today, ETH Universität Zurich, CH
 2006 Architecture made in Denmark, DAZ, Berlin, DE
 2005-06 Young Younger Youngest. Aarhus, DK (tour: Rome, IT, Stockholm, SE)
 2005 Culture led Regeneration, CUBE, Manchester, UK
 2005 Danish Architects in China, The Danish Cultural Institute, Beijing, CN
 2005 Danish Architects in the UK, the Royal Danish Embassy, London, UK
 2004 9. Biennale di Architettura, Arsenale, Venice, IT
 2003-04 Contemporary Danish Architecture, i+i, Delft, NL
 2002 Danish Architecture, Beijing, CN	
 2002 Arne Jacobsen Inspirations, Louisiana, Humlebæk, DK	
 2001 BLUE STAGE, House of World Cultures, Berlin, DE				
 2000-01 The Danish Wave (tour:, CN, JP, TW, AR) 		
 2000 Panorama des Capitales Européennes, Pavillon d’Arsenal, Paris, FR
 2000 Botschaften und Landesvertretungen in Berlin, DAZ, Berlin, DE
 1999 4. Biennal Internacional de Arquitetura, São Paulo, BR
 1999 Denmark meets Australia II (tour: main cities, AU)
 1998-99 Copenhagen – Concepts of Continuity (tour: RU, PL, DE) 				
 1996 Scandinavian Architecture, Chicago Athenaeum, Chicago, US 				
 1996 5. Biennale Architettura, Arsenale, Venice, IT

References

External links

Official website
 3XN buildings in arkitekturbilleder.dk

Architecture firms of Denmark
Architecture firms based in Copenhagen
Design companies established in 1986
Danish companies established in 1986
Recipients of the Eckersberg Medal
Companies based in Copenhagen Municipality